Bruce Robinson (born 2 May 1946) is an English actor, director, screenwriter and novelist. He wrote and directed Withnail and I (1987), a film with comic and tragic elements set in London in the late 1960s, which drew on his experiences as a struggling actor, living in poverty in Camden Town.

As an actor, he has worked with Franco Zeffirelli, Ken Russell and François Truffaut.

Early life
Bruce Robinson was born in London. He grew up in Broadstairs, Kent, where he attended the Charles Dickens Secondary Modern School. His parents were Mabel Robinson and American lawyer Carl Casriel, who had a short-term relationship during World War II. His father was a Lithuanian Jew. As a child, Robinson was constantly brutally abused by his stepfather Rob (an ex RAF navigator and a wholesale newsagent), who knew the boy was not his son. He had an elder sister Elly, whom he asked to teach him some French.

Film career

In his youth, Robinson aspired to be an actor and was admitted to the Central School of Speech and Drama in London. His first film role was as Benvolio in Franco Zeffirelli's film adaptation of Romeo and Juliet (1968). He then appeared in Ken Russell's The Music Lovers (1970), Barney Platts-Mills's Private Road (1971) and François Truffaut's The Story of Adèle H. (1975). After spending several years out of work and living on social security payments, he became disenchanted and began writing screenplays. He was soon commissioned by David Puttnam to write the screenplay for Roland Joffé's The Killing Fields (1984). Robinson was nominated for an Academy Award and won a BAFTA for his work. In 1989, Robinson wrote again for Joffé on Fat Man and Little Boy. He returned to acting briefly in 1998, taking a role in the film Still Crazy.

He is perhaps best known as the creative force behind the loosely autobiographical film Withnail and I (1987) which he based on his time as a struggling out-of-work actor. The character 'Withnail' is reportedly based on his friend, Vivian MacKerrell, the character 'I' (Marwood), on himself. Though unsuccessful at the box office, because of its success on video it has since been described as "one of Britain's biggest cult films". The film also launched the acting career of Richard E. Grant.

Robinson's next two outings as a director (How to Get Ahead in Advertising, teaming him again with Richard E. Grant and Jennifer 8, a Hollywood thriller) were not as well received. Robinson became disillusioned with the restrictive film-making practices of Hollywood and stopped directing to concentrate solely on writing. He wrote the screenplays for the films Return to Paradise (1998) and In Dreams (1999), but both were altered drastically by their producers, leaving Robinson once again disappointed.

Robinson eventually returned to directing with an adaptation of Hunter S. Thompson's novel The Rum Diary, with the main role performed by Johnny Depp. With Aaron Eckhart and Richard Jenkins also on board, filming started on 25 March 2009 in Puerto Rico. It was released in 2011. In 2012, Robinson's comic novella Paranoia in the Launderette was substantially filled out and adapted for the screen as A Fantastic Fear of Everything starring Simon Pegg. Robinson has completed a screenplay for his novel The Peculiar Memories of Thomas Penman and a book on Jack the Ripper, titled They All Love Jack, in which he names the real culprit as Michael Maybrick, otherwise best known as a composer of songs such as "The Holy City" and brother of another Ripper suspect, James Maybrick.

Author
Robinson is also a successful author. His first published work was the semi-autobiographical novel The Peculiar Memories of Thomas Penman in 1998, based on his own childhood growing up in Broadstairs, Kent. In 2000, Smoking in Bed: Conversations with Bruce Robinson, edited by Alistair Owen, was published, made up of a selection of interviews given by Robinson. Meanwhile, since becoming a father, Robinson has also written two children's books, The Obvious Elephant (2000) and Harold and the Duck (2005), both illustrated by his wife. The former is also available as an audiobook edition (2003), read by Lorelei King and Michael Maloney.
He spent about 15 years collecting and researching the materials on the mystery of Jack the Ripper, which later became his book They All Love Jack: Busting the Ripper (2015).

Personal life
Robinson married the artist Sophie Windham in 1984, and they reside in England. They have a daughter Lily and a son Willoughby.

Robinson claimed to have been the target of unwanted sexual advances by Franco Zeffirelli during the filming of Romeo and Juliet, in which Robinson played Benvolio. Robinson says that he later based the lecherous character of Uncle Monty in the film Withnail and I on Zeffirelli.

Filmography

Director/Writer

Actor
 Romeo and Juliet (1968) as Benvolio
 The Other People (1968) as Colin
 Baby Love (1969) as Man in Nightclub (uncredited)
 Tam-Lin (1970) as Alan
 The Music Lovers (1971) as Alexei Sofronov
 Private Road (1971) as Peter Morrissey
 The Story of Adèle H. (1975) as Lt Albert Pinson
 Los viajes escolares (1976) as Óscar
 The Brute (1977) as Mark
 Kleinhoff Hotel (1977) as Karl Axel
 Harry's War (1981) as IRS Agent #2
 How to Get Ahead in Advertising (1989) as The Boil (voice, uncredited)
 Still Crazy (1998) as Brian Lovell

Bibliography
 Paranoia in the Launderette (1998)
 The Peculiar Memories of Thomas Penman (1998)
 The Obvious Elephant (2000)
 Harold and the Duck (2005)
 They All Love Jack: Busting the Ripper (2015)

References

External links

 
 

1946 births
Living people
Alumni of the Royal Central School of Speech and Drama
Best Adapted Screenplay BAFTA Award winners
English film directors
English male screenwriters
English people of American-Jewish descent
English people of Lithuanian-Jewish descent
English screenwriters
People from Broadstairs
Writers Guild of America Award winners